Ouběnice is a municipality and village in Příbram District in the Central Bohemian Region of the Czech Republic. It has about 200 inhabitants.

Administrative parts
The village of Ostrov is an administrative part of Ouběnice.

References

Villages in Příbram District